The King's Medal for Music (or the Queen's Medal for Music during the reign of a queen) is an annual award, instituted in 2005, for contribution to the musical life of Great Britain. The Medal may be awarded to people of any nationality. The expenses of the award come from the Privy Purse.

The idea for this award originated with Sir Peter Maxwell Davies, then Master of the Queen's Music.  A committee headed by the Master of the Queen's Music oversees the nomination process for the award.  This committee discusses the nominees in an annual meeting, before it submits its recommendation for royal approval.  The first recipient was the Australian conductor Sir Charles Mackerras.

Recipients

 2005 Sir Charles Mackerras
 2006 Sir Bryn Terfel
 2007 Judith Weir
 2008 Kathryn Tickell
 2009 Sir Colin Davis
 2010 Dame Emma Kirkby
 2011 Nicholas Daniel
 2012 National Youth Orchestra of Great Britain
 2013 Sir Thomas Allen
 2014 Simon Halsey
 2015 Oliver Knussen
 2016 Nicola Benedetti
 2017 Thea Musgrave
 2018 Gary Crosby
 2019 Imogen Cooper
 2020 Thomas Trotter
 2021 John Wallace

References 

British music awards
Awards established in 2005
2005 establishments in the United Kingdom